Eden Valley may refer to several places:

In the United States 
 Eden Valley (Nevada), a valley in Humboldt County
 Eden Valley, Minnesota, a city 
 Eden Valley, New York, a hamlet

Elsewhere 
 Eden Valley 216, an Indian reserve in Alberta, Canada
 Eden Valley, South Australia, a town in Australia
Eden Valley wine region surrounding the town
 Eden Valley, the valley of the River Eden, Cumbria in England
 Eden Valley Railway, closed railway in the above location
 Eden Valley Railway (heritage railway), heritage railway in the above location
 Eden Valley, New Zealand, a suburb of Auckland

See also 
 Eden Valley (film), a 1994 British drama film
River Eden (disambiguation)